The Adelaide Advertiser Tournament was a golf event played in Adelaide, Australia between 1948 and 1967. Up to 1960 the event was played in March or April but was later played in September or October. The venue generally alternated between Royal Adelaide Golf Club and Kooyonga Golf Club. Prize money was £500 from 1948 to 1952, £1,000 from 1953 to 1964, £1,500 in 1965 and A$3,000 in 1966 and 1967.

Adelaide Advertiser Special Tournament
An extra event was played in October 1952 called the Adelaide Advertiser Special Tournament with prize money of £1,000. It was played at Kooyonga Golf Club with a first prize of £350. The tournament was organised because of the visit of a team of four American golfers; Jimmy Demaret, Lloyd Mangrum, Ed Oliver and Jim Turnesa. Mangrum won with a 36-hole score of 137, four strokes ahead of Oliver.

Winners

References

Golf tournaments in Australia
Golf in South Australia
Recurring sporting events established in 1948
Recurring sporting events disestablished in 1967
1948 establishments in Australia
1967 disestablishments in Australia